Manson is a ghost town in Oneida County, Wisconsin, United States. The town was marked on USGS maps as late as 1939.

References 

Geography of Oneida County, Wisconsin
Ghost towns in Wisconsin